Milorad Arsenijević (6 June 1906 – 18 March 1987) was a Serbian football player and manager. He was part of Yugoslavia's team at the 1928 Summer Olympics.

Biography
He was born in Smederevo and grew up in Šabac. He started playing for the youth squad of the local team, FK Mačva Šabac, when he was 14 years old and later debuted for the main squad. After graduating highschool, he moved to Belgrade to continue his studies. He joined BSK Belgrade, one of the dominant clubs of Yugoslav football at the time, where he would spend the rest of his career as one of their main defenders.

He earned 52 caps for the Yugoslavia national football team, including at the 1930 FIFA World Cup. After retiring as a player, he managed Yugoslavia in the 1950 FIFA World Cup and coached for a long period at lower-league Belgrade club FK Železničar Beograd. He died in 1987 in Belgrade.

References

External links
 

1906 births
1930 FIFA World Cup players
1987 deaths
Yugoslav footballers
Serbian footballers
OFK Beograd players
Yugoslav football managers
Serbian football managers
Yugoslavia international footballers
Olympic footballers of Yugoslavia
Footballers at the 1928 Summer Olympics
1950 FIFA World Cup managers
Sportspeople from Smederevo
FK Mačva Šabac players
Yugoslav First League players
Association football defenders